Agnew Burlie (1 July 1906 – 24 January 1952) was a Canadian boxer. He competed in the men's featherweight event at the 1924 Summer Olympics.

References

External links
 

1906 births
1952 deaths
Canadian male boxers
Olympic boxers of Canada
Boxers at the 1924 Summer Olympics
Sportspeople from Dundee
Featherweight boxers